Bird Island is a  island in the Hrušovská zdrž (2518 ha), which is part of Gabčíkovo Reservoir, south-west of Šamorín, Slovakia. The island was built because of the constructions of the Gabčíkovo-Nagymaros dams on the Danube as habitat compensation for areas consequently flooded. The island is part of proposed special protected areas Dunajské luhy for waterbirds. The most important breeding birds are Mediterranean gull (Larus melanocephalus), which is the only breeding site in Slovakia, and common redshank (Tringa totanus), for which it is the only breeding site in West Slovakia. Access is prohibited during the breeding and wintering seasons.

Importance for birds generally 
 one from the most important breeding sites for gulls in Slovakia
 the island is one of the last sites where waterbirds can breed after construction of the water reservoir Gabčíkovo and destruction of flooded forests and branches of the Danube
 the conditions for breeding and wintering of waterbirds are depending on management of habitats

Geography 

 area 
 the majority of the island is grassy, without coherent forest
 the coast is rocky, hard accessible
 the nearest bank of the Danube is  distant

Breeding birds 
 Black-headed gull
 Mediterranean gull
 Common tern

Wintering birds 
 Tufted duck
 Common pochard
 Greater white-fronted goose

See also
Vtáčí ostrov (Orava reservoir) - an identically named island in northern Slovakia (in the Orava Water Reservoir) that also serves as an important Protected Bird Area

References

External links
 Volunteers helped bird protection in 2005 

B
B
B